= Man-Shield =

Man-Shield is a privately owned Canadian construction company founded in Winnipeg, Manitoba in 1972, with 2007 sales volume of CDN$93,818,121. A 2008 dispute between Man-Shield, and Zephyr, a property owner-developer, set important precedents in interpreting the Canadian Builders’ Lien Act. In December 2008 a consortium led by Man-Shield won a CA$60 million contract for redevelopment of the Thunder Bay waterfront. That contract has since been lost.
